Qaleh Juq (also Romanized as Qal‘eh Jūq; also known as Ghal‘eh Jogh, Qal‘eh Jokh, Qal‘eh Joq, Qal‘eh Jūkh, Qal‘eh-ye Joq, and Qal‘eh-ye Jūq Dar Jazīn) is a village in Mofatteh Rural District, in the Central District of Famenin County, Hamadan Province, Iran. At the 2006 census, its population was 1,271, in 268 families.

References 

Populated places in Famenin County